Joanna Dittmann (born 9 February 1992) is a Polish rower. She competed in the women's coxless four event at the 2020 Summer Olympics.

References

External links
 

1992 births
Living people
Polish female rowers
Olympic rowers of Poland
Rowers at the 2020 Summer Olympics
Place of birth missing (living people)
World Rowing Championships medalists